The Milk Marketing Board was a producer-run product marketing board, established by the Agricultural Marketing Act 1933, to control milk production and distribution in the United Kingdom. It functioned as buyer of last resort in the milk market in Britain, thereby guaranteeing a minimum price for milk producers. It also participated in the development of milk products, introducing Lymeswold cheese. It was based at Thames Ditton in Surrey.

Advertising 

From the 1950s onwards, there were several memorable advertising campaigns by the Milk Marketing Board. Slogans included "full of natural goodness", "is your man getting enough?", "milk's gotta lotta bottle" (written by the advertising executive Rod Allen), and "drinka pinta milka day" designed by the advertising agency Ogilvy. In the 1980s, they ran the advert "Accrington Stanley, Who Are They?".

The campaigns were largely on ITV television, but were also printed on the returnable milk bottles delivered by milkmen. The Milk Marketing Board sponsored the Milk Race Tour of Britain cycle race from 1958 to 1993, at thirty five years, making it the longest cycle sponsorship ever in the United Kingdom. The Milk Marketing Board also sponsored the Football League Cup from 1981 to 1986, renaming it the Milk Cup.

Dissolution 
The board's responsibilities effectively ended, save for residual functions, in April 1994, with deregulation of the milk market in Britain following the Agriculture Act 1993. Its former processing division, Dairy Crest, remains in existence as a subsidiary of the Canadian firm Saputo Inc. The Milk Marketing Board was finally dissolved in January 2002. The Scottish Milk Marketing Board was similarly dissolved in December 2003. Dairy UK is a current trade association representing the dairy industry in the United Kingdom.

Arms

References

1933 establishments in the United Kingdom
2002 disestablishments in the United Kingdom
Agricultural organisations based in the United Kingdom
Borough of Elmbridge
Dairy farming in the United Kingdom
Dairy marketing
Dairy organizations
Defunct companies based in Surrey
Marketing boards
Organisations based in Surrey
Organizations established in 1933
Organizations disestablished in 2002
Science and technology in Surrey